CHUK-FM is a First Nations community radio station that operates at 107.3 FM in Mashteuiatsh, Quebec, Canada.

Owned by Corporation Médiatique Teuehikan, the station received CRTC approval in 1995.

References

External links
CHUK-FM
 

Huk